The New York Arrows were an indoor soccer team that played in the original Major Indoor Soccer League (MISL) from 1978 to 1984.  They won the first four MISL championships.

History

Preparing for the first season
In 1978, the New York Arrows began their first season as an indoor soccer team in the newly-established Major Indoor Soccer League (MISL). They were owned by Bernie Rodin, and John Luciani who also owned the Rochester Lancers of the North American Soccer League. While preparing for the MISL's inaugural season, the Arrows' imported nearly the entire roster of the Lancers, which played a spring-to-fall schedule.

However, the Arrows did make one significant, and crucial, addition:  they signed Steve Zungul, a virtually unknown Yugoslavian player. Zungul was a seasoned outdoor player from HNK Hajduk Split who had gained the approval of the Yugoslavia Football Federation to play outside of his native country for a few months. When he refused to return to Hajduk, the Yugoslavia Football Federation obtained a ruling from FIFA forbidding any outdoor team from signing him. This ruled out nearly every club in the world, and forced Zungul to sign with a team in the newly established MISL.

On December 22, 1978, the New York Arrows kicked off the first season of MISL, playing in the league's first game, at home versus the Cincinnati Kids.

Champions
The decision to import the Lancers paid off, as the Arrows finished second out of six teams. Only the Houston Summit had a better record, but it was the Arrows who took the title, defeating the Philadelphia Fever.

The Arrows finished first in their division the next three years, before taking the titles over the Houston Summit (1979–80) and the St. Louis Steamers (1980–81 and 1981–82).

Dominating players
While the Arrows dominated the league as a team, several Arrows players gained repeated individual recognition. In his four seasons with the Arrows, Steve Zungul, "The Lord of All Indoors", regularly scored nearly five goals per game and in one instance, scored seven in a game versus the Chicago Horizons in 1981. His scoring exploits led to his selection as League MVP four times running. He was also the four time league scoring leader and a two time assists leader. While Zungul was head and shoulders above nearly every other player in the league, he was not the only Arrows great. Shep Messing was the first championship series MVP and a perennial all star. His replacement, Zoltan Toth, was the 1982–1983 Goalkeeper of the Year. Juli Veee was an outstanding midfielder while Branko Šegota was a perennial All Star. However, these are merely a handful of great Arrows players.

Decline and bankruptcy
Though a powerhouse on the field, they were not a powerhouse at the box office.  Shortly after the team won its fourth and final MISL title, the team was sold.  In January 1983, the team traded Steve Zungul to the San Jose Earthquakes for Gary Etherington and Gordon Hill.  While billed as a move to "Americanize" the Arrows, it was largely a cost saving device.  While Zungul went on to become the NASL League MVP in 1984, the Arrows collapsed and folded at the end of the season. The six seasons in the MISL the Arrows avg. 6,440 per game.

Arena
Their home arena was Nassau Coliseum in Uniondale, New York.

Management
 Owner – John Luciani (1978–1982)
 Owner – David Schoenstadt (1982–1984)
 General Manager – Tod Leiweke

Coaches
 Dragan Popović 1978–1983
 Shep Messing 1983
 Joe Machnik

Year-by-year

Honors
MISL Championship
 1979, 1980, 1981, 1982

League MVP
 1978–1979 Slaviša Žungul
 1979–1980 Slaviša Žungul
 1980–1981 Slaviša Žungul
 1981–1982 Slaviša Žungul

Championship MVP
 1978–1979 Shep Messing
 1979–1980 Slaviša Žungul
 1980–1981 Slaviša Žungul
 1981–1982 Slaviša Žungul

Scoring Champion
 1979–1980 Slaviša Žungul
 1980–1981 Slaviša Žungul
 1981–1982 Slaviša Žungul
 1982–1983 Slaviša Žungul

Pass Master (Assists Leader)
 1979–1980 Slaviša Žungul
 1981–1982 Slaviša Žungul

Defender of the Year
 1981–1982 Veljko Tukša

Goalkeeper of the Year
 1982–1983 Zoltan Toth

Coach of the Year
 1980–1981 Dragan Popović

First Team All MISL
 1978–1979: Shep Messing, Slaviša Žungul
 1979–1980: Shep Messing, Branko Šegota, Slaviša Žungul
 1980–1981: Shep Messing, David D'Errico, Branko Šegota, Slaviša Žungul
 1981–1982: Veljko Tukša, Slaviša Žungul
 1982–1983: Veljko Tukša

Significant players
  Fernando Clavijo
 David D'Errico
  Fred Grgurev
 Shep Messing
  Doc Lawson
  Branko Šegota
 Zoltan Toth
  Juli Veee
  Slaviša Žungul

References

External links
  1979 Championship series roster

 
Association football clubs established in 1978
Defunct indoor soccer clubs in the United States
Sports in Long Island
Arrows
Major Indoor Soccer League (1978–1992) teams
Association football clubs disestablished in 1984
1978 establishments in New York (state)
1984 disestablishments in New York (state)